Lieutenant General Naeem Khalid Lodhi (R) was commissioned in the Army on 27 October 1974 in the Corps of Engineers. He has a Bachelors's in Civil Engineering. Naeem Lodhi is a graduate of Pakistan Command and Staff College and National Defence University. He also holds a Masters' in International Relations. He has served on various command, staff, and instructional assignments in his career in the Army including the important appointments of Directing Staff at the National Defence University, Pakistan, Commander Corps Engineers, Director General Engineering Directorate, Director General Staff Duties Directorate, General Officer Commanding Bahawalpur, General Headquarters Rawalpindi and Corps Commander Bahawalpur. On account of his distinguished military service, he has been conferred the award of Hilal-i-Imtiaz (M). 

General Naeem Khalid Lodhi was made the Defence Secretary of Pakistan on 28 November 2011. He was replaced by Nargis Sethi in January 2012. 

He has also remained the Chief Executive and Managing Director of Fauji Fertilizer Co. Ltd & FFC Energy Limited.

General Naeem Khalid Lodhi has written various articles columns in different National and International newspapers. Now he is working in an Engineering Firm, H-Cube Pvt Ltd., as a consultant and adviser.

On 27 June 2018, General Naeem Khalid Lodhi was made Minister of Defence in a Caretaker Government before the 2018 Pakistani general election.

He is also working as a defence analyst, appearing on TV shows.

References

Year of birth missing (living people)
Pakistani generals
Living people
